At , the Hochkalter in the Berchtesgaden Alps is the highest peak in the massif of the same name and therefore one of the highest mountains in Germany. The Hochkalter Massif (German: Hochkalterstock or Hochkaltermassiv) is also called the Hochkalter mountains (German: Hochkaltergebirge).

The Hochkalter massif lies west of the Watzmann massif and, like it, is located within the Berchtesgaden National Park. The Hochkalter mountains are divided into sub-groups known as the Hochkalter Group (Hochkalter-Gruppe), Hocheis Group (Hocheis-Gruppe) and Southern Wimbach Chain (Südliche Wimbachkette). Other mountain huts are the Bergheim Hirschbichl for the Hocheis Group, the Wimbachgries Hut (Wimbachgrieshütte) for climbs up the eastern flanks of the massif and the Ingolstädter Haus for the Southern Wimbach Chain.

Geology of the Hochkalter mountains 

The Hochkalter mountains, like the entire Northern Limestone Alps, consist of a mixture of dolomite and limestone. In the Hochkalter and Hocheis Groups, the harder Dachstein limestone predominates, rock that was formed by sedimentation in the Tethys Ocean during the Late Triassic stage (220 million years ago). When the Alps were formed the sloping strata of Dachstein limestone were tipped at an angle of 30° to 40° by tectonic movements of the African and European continental plates. The result can be clearly seen on the Hochkalter massif especially in the Ofen valley (Ofental). Much of the Southern Wimbach Chain comprises brittle Ramsau dolomite, which has contributed significantly to the accumulation of rocks in the Wimbach valley.

Rockfalls 

Large rockfalls occurred time and again on the Hochkalter massif. In prehistoric times – around 3,500 years ago – more than 15 million m³ of rock slid from the upper Blaueis Combe into the valley. These rockslides impounded the lake of Hintersee. Even today the large glacial erratics in the Zauber Forest bear witness to this monumental event. But even in recent times there have frequently been large rock-falls:

On 24 August 1908 the summit of the Hochkalter came crashing down and changed the appearance and height of the peak markedly. The volume of rock broken off is estimated at 240,000 m³. The rock fall was felt in the Ramsau valley as an earthquake. 
On 25 July 1954 the second Blaueis pinnacle on the northern arete of the Blaueisspitze collapsed.  
Nine years later to the day, on 25 July 1963, the collapse of a column on the Schärtenspitze resulted in the route up the north face becoming much more difficult.
In February 1959 several hundred thousand cubic metres of rock slid from the area of the Palfelhörner onto the snow below in the upper reaches of the Wimbach valley.

The brittleness of the rock in the Wimbach valley is very obvious. The floor of the valley is covered by streams of debris of great depth. This magnificent landscape may be experienced by anyone who walks from Ramsau (Wimbach Bridge car park) along the valley, initially through the Wimbach Gorge and then onto the open valley floor (about one hour to the  Wimbachschloss Inn, a further hour to the Wimbachgries Hut, 1,327 m).

Overview of the Hochkalter summits 

Hochkalter Group
Hochkalter,	2,607 m
Ofentalhörnl,	2,513 m
Kleinkalter,	2,513 m
Blaueisspitze, 2,480 m
Steintalhörnl,	2,468 m
Rotpalfen (Wasserwandkopf),	2,367 m
Schärtenspitze,	2,153 m
Steinberg,	2,065 m
Am Hund, 	1,803 m
Stanglahnerkopf,	1,791 m
Schottmalhorn,	1,662 m

Hocheis Group
Hocheisspitze,	2,523 m
Hinterberghorn,	2,493 m
Kammerlinghorn,	2,483 m
Hinterbergkopf,	2,247 m
Hocheishörnl,	2,252 m
Karlkogel,	2,195 m
Eislhörnl,	2,095 m
Vorderberghörnl,	2,083 m
Kleineishörnl,	1,934 m
Southern Wimbachkette
Seehorn,	2,321 m
Großes Palfelhorn,	2,222 m
Kleines Palfelhorn,	2,073 m
Alpelhorn,	2,254 m
Kühleitenschneid,
Prunnerkopf,	2,076 m
Sigeretkopf,	2,066 m

References

Sources 

 Max Zeller: Das Hochkaltergebirge, Teil 1, in: Heinrich Heß (Hrsg.): Zeitschrift des Deutschen und Österreichischen Alpen-Vereins 1914, Wien 1914, S.177-218.
 Max Zeller: Das Hochkaltergebirge, Teil 2, in: Heinrich Heß (Hrsg.): Zeitschrift des Deutschen und Österreichischen Alpen-Vereins 1915, Wien 1915, S.157-200.

External links 

 Summitpost Information about the Hochkalter  
 Homepage of the Blaueishütte 
 Hochkalter route description with photos 

Mountains of the Alps
Mountains of Bavaria
Berchtesgaden Alps
Berchtesgadener Land
Two-thousanders of Germany